Al-Adalah Football Club ("Justice F.C."), is a Saudi Arabian professional football club based in Al-Hulaylah, Al-Ahsa, that plays in the Saudi Professional League. The club was founded in 1984.

Al-Adalah have finished as Second Division runners-up twice, first in the 2008–09 season and then in the 2015–16 season. The club have spent only four seasons in the Saudi First Division, the second tier of Saudi football, before achieving promotion to the Pro League. On May 15, 2019, the club made history by achieving promotion to the Pro League for the first time.

The club play their home games at Prince Abdullah bin Jalawi Stadium in Al-Ahsa, sharing the stadium with three other Al-Ahsa based clubs, Al-Fateh, Hajer and Al-Jeel.

Honours
 Saudi First Division League (Tier 2)
 Runners-up: 2021–22
 Third place: 2018–19

 Saudi Second Division (Tier 3)
 Runners-up: 2008–09, 2015–16

 Saudi Third Division/Saudi Fourth Division (Tier 4)
 Winners: 2000–01

Current squad 
As of 13 June 2021:

Out on loan

Former managers
 Mohammed Al-Janoubi (August 22, 2002 – October 17, 2002)
 Hussain Al-Abdulwahab (October 17, 2002 – December 18, 2002)
 Hassine Menestiri (December 18, 2002 – April 30, 2003)
 Ahmed Al-Habib (August 1, 2003 – January 24, 2004)
 Khamis Gera (January 24, 2004 – March 21, 2004)
 Hussain Al-Abdulwahab (March 23, 2004 – August 13, 2005)
 Mehrez Al Dami (August 13, 2005 – September 21, 2005)
 Hussain Al-Abdulwahab (caretaker) (September 21, 2005 – October 20, 2005)
 Morsi Ktata (October 20, 2005 – July 10, 2006)
 Ali Zouari (July 24, 2006 – October 5, 2006)
 Samir Al Khamira (October 5, 2006 – January 9, 2007)
 Ahmed Al-Habib (caretaker) (January 9, 2007 – February 4, 2007)
 Najib Khouaja (February 4, 2007 – May 30, 2007)
 Mahdi Ben Sohaima (June 18, 2007 – November 3, 2007)
 Ahmed Al-Habib (caretaker) (November 3, 2007 – November 19, 2007)
 Mohamed Zouiten (November 19, 2007 – January 23, 2008)
 Najib Khouaja (January 23, 2008 – May 17, 2009)
 Zouhair Louati (July 18, 2009 – March 5, 2010)
 Abdullah Darwish (March 5, 2010 – May 10, 2010)
 Morsi Ktata (July 14, 2010 – March 20, 2011)
 Nasser Nefzi (March 20, 2011 – May 30, 2011)
 Habib Ben Romdhane (August 1, 2011 – December 1, 2011)
 Najib Khouaja (December 1, 2011 – December 20, 2012)
 Wahid Hidoussi (December 20, 2012 – May 30, 2013)
 Salah Abou El Fattouh (July 31, 2013 – November 23, 2013)
 Noureddine Labyad (November 23, 2013 – June 1, 2014)
 Selim Al Manga (August 13, 2014 – May 30, 2015)
 Mohamed Saidi (July 30, 2015 – November 14, 2016)
 Ahmed Sari (November 14, 2016 – March 20, 2017)
 Abdullah Darwish (March 27, 2017 – May 5, 2018)
 Ridha Jeddi (May 15, 2018 – April 26, 2019)
 Redha Al-Janbe (April 26, 2019 – May 16, 2019)
 Skander Kasri (May 31, 2019 – November 4, 2019)
 Nacif Beyaoui (November 5, 2019 – June 13, 2020)
 Giovanni Solinas (June 25, 2020 – September 9, 2020)
 Mohamed Mkacher (September 18, 2020 – January 29, 2021)
 Jalel Kadri (January 31, 2021 – June 1, 2021)
 Nacif Beyaoui (June 3, 2021 – March 18, 2022)
 Yousef Al Mannai (March 18, 2022 – October 22, 2022)
 Martin Ševela (October 23, 2022 – )

References

Adalah
Adalah
Adalah
Adalah